The Cage is a 2017 Bangladeshi drama film directed by Akram Khan. It was selected as the Bangladeshi entry for the Best Foreign Language Film at the 90th Academy Awards, but it was not nominated.

Plot
As British colonial rule ends in 1947, a Brahmin family decides to move from the newly formed Dominion of Pakistan to the Dominion of India.

Cast
 Jaya Ahsan as Sarojini
 Azad Abul Kalam as Ambujakkho

See also
 List of submissions to the 90th Academy Awards for Best Foreign Language Film
 List of Bangladeshi submissions for the Academy Award for Best Foreign Language Film

References

External links
 

Adaptations of works by Hasan Azizul Huq
2017 films
2017 drama films
2010s Bengali-language films
Bengali-language Bangladeshi films
Bangladeshi drama films
Best Film Meril-Prothom Alo Critics Award winners